Six Against the Rock is a 1987 American film on TV about the Battle of Alcatraz, based on Clark Howard's book about the aborted 1946 escape attempt.

Cast

References

External links

1987 television films
1987 films
American prison films
Alcatraz Island in fiction
American television films
Films directed by Paul Wendkos
1980s American films